"Belong" is a song by Swedish DJ Axwell and Russian musician Shapov. It was remixed by D.O.D. A global music video competition was held as Axwell partnered with Revolt.TV to reveal the winner of the competition.

Music video
Panchito, a white Maltese who attempts to return to home, finds himself going through and 'battling' the harsh environment. His owners appear at the end of the video. The video was directed by Jose Javy Ferrer.

Track listing

Charts

Weekly charts

Year-end charts

References

2016 songs
2016 singles
Axwell songs
Ultra Records singles